The SKV group of schools was founded by the Venkateswar Trust in Tiruchengode in  2005. It is a full-fledged school recognized by the Government of Tamil Nadu. It is a Co-education institution partly residential. The school follows the curriculum and syllabus prescribed by the Matriculation Board of Tamil Nadu Govt and the stateboard syllabus too and prepare the pupils for the Matriculation and Higher Secondary school examinations.

See also

Education in Tamil Nadu

External links
 

Schools in Tamil Nadu
Education in Namakkal district
Educational institutions established in 2005
2005 establishments in Tamil Nadu